SuperTex is a 2003 English-language Dutch film directed by Jan Schütte and starring Stephen Mangan, Jan Decleir, Maureen Lipman, and Victor Löw.

Cast
 Stephen Mangan
 Jan Decleir
 Elliot Levey
 Tracy-Ann Oberman

External links
 

2003 films
2003 drama films
German drama films
Dutch drama films
English-language Dutch films
English-language German films
Films directed by Jan Schütte
Films scored by Zbigniew Preisner
Films based on Dutch novels
2000s English-language films
2000s German films